At Your Own Risk is the second studio album by American West Coast hip hop artist King Tee. It was released on September 24, 1990 via Capitol Records. Production was handled by several record producers, including DJ Pooh, E-Swift, Bilal Bashir, Bronick Wrobleski, J.R. Coes, DJ Aladdin, and King T himself. It also features guest appearances provided by Ice Cube and Breeze on the album's final track "Played Like a Piano". The album spawned four singles: "Ruff Rhyme (Back Again)", "Diss You", "At Your Own Risk" and "Played Like a Piano", which were later included on the rapper's greatest hits album titled Ruff Rhymes: Greatest Hits Collection.

The album peaked at number 175 on the US Billboard 200 and number 35 on the Top R&B/Hip-Hop Albums. Its single "Ruff Rhyme (Back Again)" peaked at number 18 on the Hot Rap Songs.

Track listing

Personnel
 Roger McBride – main artist, producer (tracks: 1, 2, 13), mixing (tracks: 1, 2, 8, 10)
 O'Shea Jackson – featured artist (track 14)
 M.C. Breeze – featured artist (track 14)
 Mark S. Jordan – producer (tracks: 2, 3, 5-7, 9-14), co-producer (track 4), mixing (tracks: 3-7, 9-14)
 Bilal Bashir – producer (tracks: 1, 8)
 J.R. Coes – producer (track 4), co-producer (track 7)
 Bronek Wroblewski – producer (track 4)
 Eric Brooks – producer (track 11)
 Bob Morse – engineering (tracks: 1, 3-7, 9-14)
 Vachik Aghaniantz – engineering (tracks: 2, 8)
 Alphonso Henderson – mixing (track 10)
 Glen E. Friedman – photography
 Jorge Hinojosa – management
 Eric Greenspan – management

Album singles

Chart positions 
Album

Singles

References

External links 

1990 albums
King Tee albums
Capitol Records albums
Albums produced by DJ Pooh
Albums produced by DJ Aladdin